Byron Township is the name of two towns in the U.S. state of Minnesota:
Byron Township, Cass County, Minnesota
Byron Township, Waseca County, Minnesota

See also
Byron Township (disambiguation)

Minnesota township disambiguation pages